The Goose River is a river in Knox County, Maine.

See also
List of rivers of Maine

References

Maine Streamflow Data from the USGS
Maine Watershed Data From Environmental Protection Agency

Rivers of Knox County, Maine
Penobscot Bay